Ano Kastritsi is a village in the municipal unit of Rio, Achaea, Greece. It is situated at about 500 m elevation in the forested northwestern foothills of the Panachaiko, 6 km southeast of Rio town centre, Kato Kastritsi is 4 km to the northwest. It is known for the views to the east part of Patras, the Corinthian Gulf, the Rio-Antirio Bridge, and for its taverns and food.

Historical population

See also
List of settlements in Achaea

References

Populated places in Achaea
Rio, Greece